Oh Snap may refer to:
 Oh Snap (EP), an EP by the Christian rock band Philmont
 "London Bridge (Oh Snap)", a 2006 song by Fergie

See also
 "Aw, Snap!", an error message in Chromium and Google Chrome; see 
 "Squats" (song), a 2015 song by Oh Snap! and Bombs Away